Richard Ray Middleton (born November 28, 1951 in Delaware, Ohio) is a former American football player who played linebacker in the National Football League from 1974 through 1978. He attended Rutherford B. Hayes High School (Delaware, Ohio) and played college football at the Ohio State University.

He is now a High School History/Psychology/Government Teacher at Olentangy High School.

External links
NFL.com player page

1951 births
Living people
Players of American football from Columbus, Ohio
American football linebackers
Ohio State Buckeyes football players
New Orleans Saints players
San Diego Chargers players